Ibrahima N'Diaye (born 2 May 1948) is a Malian politician who served in the government of Mali as Minister of Employment and Vocational Training. He was also Second Vice-President of the Alliance for Democracy in Mali (ADEMA).

Biography 
N'Diaye was born in Kayes. At ADEMA's Constitutive Congress, held on 25–26 May 1991, he was elected as Deputy Secretary for Solidarity. He was subsequently elected as the Secretary-General of ADEMA at the party's First Ordinary Congress in September 1994; after five years in that post, he was instead elected as ADEMA's Second Vice-President in October 1999. He also served as Mayor of Bamako, the capital, from 1998 to 2003.

While speaking on television on 6 March 2001, N'Diaye said that magistrates in Mali were corrupt; together with Sidiki Konaté, the director of state television, he was accused of defamation by the Malian Union of Judges. In mid-May 2001, he and Konaté were sentenced to one month in jail and fined 1.5 million CFA francs.

References

1948 births
Living people
Alliance for Democracy in Mali politicians
Government ministers of Mali
People from Kayes
21st-century Malian people